The men's high jump event at the 1988 World Junior Championships in Athletics was held in Sudbury, Ontario, Canada, at Laurentian University Stadium on 30 and 31 July.

Medalists

Results

Final
31 July

Qualifications
30 Jul

Group A

Group B

Participation
According to an unofficial count, 18 athletes from 14 countries participated in the event.

References

High jump
High jump at the World Athletics U20 Championships